Easthill stone circle, also known as the Seven Grey Stanes, is a small oval stone circle 3¾ miles south-west of Dumfries. Eight stones of a probable nine remain. Despite being considerably smaller, the shape and orientation of the circle link it to the nearby Twelve Apostles and the other large ovals of Dumfriesshire. It is a scheduled monument.

See also 
Stone circles in the British Isles and Brittany
List of stone circles

References

Stone circles in Dumfries and Galloway